Kondapalli Dasarath Kumar, better known as Dasaradh, is an Indian film director and screenwriter who works in Telugu cinema. He has directed films like Santosham (2002) and Mr. Perfect (2011).

Personal life
Dasaradh was born on 5 June 1971, to a Telugu Brahmin big family, in Khammam, Telangana.
He married Sesha Sowmya, in 2005 and has two daughters.

Career
Before coming to films, he worked for TV Media as a Screenplay and dialogue writer for four soap operas with noted author and writer, Yandamuri Veerendranath. One of the series called Vennello Aada Pilla aired at Doordarshan, Andhra Pradesh was a commercial success.

He has also worked as associate director for Veera Shankar's film Hello I Love You,  Tulasi Kumar's film Harischandra, YVS Chowdary's film Yuvaraju, Teja's film Chitram, Nuvvu Nenu,  Family Circus and B. V. Ramana's film Subhavela.

Filmography

Director

Shourya - 2016
Greeku Veerudu - 2013
Mr. Perfect - 2011
Swagatam - 2008
Sri - 2005
Sambaram - 2003
Santosham - 2002

Writer 
Subhavela - 2000
Family Circus - 2001
Nuvvu Nenu - 2001
Santosham - 2002
Sambaram - 2003
Sri - 2005
Swagatam - 2008
Mr. Perfect - 2011
Greeku Veerudu - 2013
Shourya - 2016

Awards
Nandi Awards
Nandi Award for Best Feature Film, Bronze - Santosham - 2002
Filmfare Award for Best film - Santosham - 2002

Other Awards
Southern India Cinematographers Association Award - 2002

References

External links

21st-century Indian film directors
Telugu film directors
1971 births
Living people
People from Khammam district
Film directors from Telangana